Masato Ide ( 井 手 雅人, い で ま さ と , Ide Masato?), born on January 1, 1920, in Saga, Japan and died on July 17, 1989, was a Japanese screenwriter and novelist.

Selected filmography

Cinema
 1951 : Sasurai no kōro
 1951 : Koi no rantan
 1952 : Musume jūku wa mada junjō yo
 1953 : Kenbei
 1955 : Dansei No. 1
 1955 : Vanished Enlisted Man ( Kieta chutai )
 1955 : Gokumonchō
 1956 : Hadashi no seishun
 1957 : Kao
 1957 : Sanjūrokunin no jōkyaku
 1957 : The Loyal Forty-Seven Ronin ( Dai Chūshingura )
 1957 : Ippon-gatana dohyō iri
 1958 : Point and Line ( Ten to sen )
 1960 : Sake to onna to yari
 1961 : Official Gunman ( Kēnju yaro ni gōyojin )
 1961 : Confessions of a wife ( Tsuma wa kokuhaku suru )
 1961 : Yato kaze no naka o hashiru
 1962 : Man with Te Dragon Tattoo ( Hana to ryu )
 1962 : Doburoku no Tatsu
 1963 : Dokuritsu kikanjūtai imada shagekichu
 1964 : Garakuta
 1965 : Goben no tsubaki
 1965 : Barberousse ( 赤 ひ げ , Akahige ? ) By Akira Kurosawa
 1965 : Shonin no isu
 1966 : Abare Gōemon
 1968 : Seishun
 1968 : Kurobe's Sun ( 黒 部 の 太陽 , Kurobe no taiyō ? ) By Kei Kumai
 1977 : Arasuka monogatari
 1978 : The Summer of the Demon ( 鬼畜 , Kichiku ? ) By Yoshitarō Nomura
 1978 : Dainamaito don don
 1980 : Kagemusha, Shadow of the Warrior ( 影武者 , Kagemusha ? ) By Akira Kurosawa
 1980 : Warui yatsura
 1980 : Furueru shita
 1985 : Ran ( 乱 , Ran ? ) From Akira Kurosawa
 1986 : Shiroi yabō
 1987 : Jirō monogatari
 1992 : Woman in an oil hell ( 女 殺 油 地獄 , Onna goroshi abura no jigoku ? ) By Hideo Gosha

Television
 List of Lone Wolf and Cub episodes

Books
 Masato Ide "People and Scenarios" (1991, Scenario Writers Association)

Awards
 1987 Nominee BAFTA Film Award
 Best Screenplay - Adapted Ran (1985)
 1979 Nominee Award of the Japanese Academy
 Best Screenplay - Kichiku (1978) & Dainamaito don don (1978)

References

1920 births
1989 deaths
Japanese film directors
Japanese novelists
20th-century Japanese screenwriters